Hegerfeldt's theorem is a no-go theorem that demonstrates the incompatibility of the existence of localized discrete particles with the combination of the principles of quantum mechanics and special relativity. It has been used to support the conclusion that reality must be described solely in terms of field-based formulations.

Specifically, Hegerfeldt's theorem implies that an initially localized free particle whose time evolution is determined by a positive Hamiltonian must instaneously expand its wavefunction to infinity, thus violating Einstein causality by exceeding the speed of light.

The theorem was developed by Gerhard C. Hegerfeldt and first published in 1998.

References

See also 
 Malament's theorem
 Wave–particle duality
 Local realism

No-go theorems
Quantum field theory
Theory of relativity
Theorems in quantum mechanics